Luis Ignacio Urive Alvirde (born December 22, 1982), better known by his ring name Místico (Spanish for "Mystic"), is a Mexican luchador enmascarado (or masked professional wrestler), who currently works for Consejo Mundial de Lucha Libre (CMLL). Initially working as Místico, he later signed with WWE, where he was known under the name Sin Cara (Spanish for "Without Face" or "Faceless"). Upon his return to Mexico, he worked under the name  Myzteziz in AAA, before settling on the ring name Carístico upon returning to CMLL in 2015. In 2021, he regained the Místico name, due to his successor and tag team partner Místico II leaving CMLL.

From 2006 to 2011, Urive was the top técnico (those that portray the good guys) and was the biggest box office draw in Mexico for a number of years. Despite having worked under previous ring names, he gained popularity in CMLL as Místico, a religious character who was the storyline protégé of the wrestling priest Fray Tormenta. Between 2011 and 2014, he worked for WWE under the ring name Sin Cara (after which, his ring name was given to his storyline rival Hunico). Urive then worked for Lucha Libre AAA Worldwide (AAA), adopting the name Myzteziz, and returned to CMLL in 2015 under the name Carístico. On two occasions in 2008, Místico held five championships simultaneously and has won most major CMLL championships over the years as well as CMLL's Torneo Gran Alternativa and Leyenda de Plata tournaments on three occasions each.

Urive is the son of Miguel Urive, who wrestled under the ring name Dr. Karonte, the brother of wrestlers Astro Boy, Argos, Argenis and Dr. Karonte Jr, the cousin of wrestlers Magnus and Ulises Jr. as well as the nephew of CMLL booker Tony Salazar.

Personal life
While most masked luchadors do not reveal their real name unless they are unmasked in a Lucha de Apuestas match, Luis Ignacio Urive Alvirde's full name was revealed by WWE when they released Urive from his contract in 2014. Urive was born on December 22, 1982, in Mexico City, Mexico, son of Miguel Urive. Urive was a professional wrestler known under the name "Dr. Karonte".  He is one of at least five of Miguel Urive's sons to become a professional wrestler, His older brother worked under the name "Astro Boy" until his death in the late 1990s,  his younger brothers work as the masked wrestlers Argos, Argenis,  and Karonte Jr. Urive's uncle, Tony Salazar, is a retired wrestler who ended up working for Consejo Mundial de Lucha Libre (CMLL) as both a trainer and a booker,  Salazar's son Magnus also works for CMLL.

Professional wrestling career

Training and early career (1998–2003) 
Urive was trained for his professional wrestling debut by his father and his uncle Tony Salazar. Místico made his debut on April 30, 1998, working as "Dr. Karonte, Jr." at the age of 15. In 2000, he changed his ring name to "Astro Boy" in honor of his older brother who had died months earlier, who had worked as the original Astro Boy. Later on, he was joined by another brother who worked as "Astro Boy II" to form a tag team. In 2003, Místico traveled to Japan to work for Michinoku Pro Wrestling where he was billed as "Komachi", a ring persona he took over from fellow luchador Volador Jr. who had played the part for about a year.

Consejo Mundial de Lucha Libre

Rise to stardom (2004–2009) 
In 2004, Urive was repackaged as Místico and given an elaborate backstory to go with his new ring persona. Místico (the character) was an orphan taken in by the wrestling priest Fray Tormenta and taught to wrestle by him before making his debut for CMLL in 2004. CMLL had tried to use the storyline previously with El Sagrado, but it had failed to take off. Following his debut as Místico, he began teaming with Volador Jr. and Misterioso II, working the second or third match of the card. He participated in the 6th Annual Leyenda de Plata tournament but did not make it past the first round. He had more success in the 2004 Gran Alternativa tag team tournament, which he won with established star El Hijo del Santo. After winning the Gran Alternativa, Místico was nicknamed El Principe de Plata y Oro (the Prince of Silver and Gold), after the main colors of his outfits. Shortly afterward, the bookers began teaming him with other established técnicos (faces), such as Negro Casas and Shocker, against the top rudo (heel) groups, Los Guerreros del Infierno and La Furia del Norte. His stature made him an underdog and his high-flying moves, such as diving arm-drags, made him popular with Mexico City crowds. The Wrestling Observer Newsletter voted Místico the 2006 "Performer of the Year", "Biggest Box Office Draw", and "Best Flying Wrestler" in their "Year-End Awards". He was also ranked third in Pro Wrestling Illustrateds list of the top 500 wrestlers of 2007.

In 2005, he continued working against Los Guerreros, winning important singles matches against Rey Bucanero, Mephisto and Tarzan Boy in CMLL's secondary arena, Arena Coliseo. He won his first title by defeating Guerreros member Averno for the NWA World Middleweight Championship on February 11. The match was well received by the audience in attendance and fans near the ring threw money into the ring as a sign of appreciation. Two weeks later, he participated in his first singles main event match when he faced Los Guerreros del Infierno leader Último Guerrero in Arena México. He won the fall in two falls after Guerrero was disqualified in the first fall and was pinned in the second with a small package. The match sparked a program with the recently turned Dr. Wagner Jr. teaming with Místico against Último Guerrero and Rey Bucanero. After that program died down, Místico became involved in a feud with Perro Aguayo Jr. and his Los Perros del Mal group. After defeating Aguayo in a singles match, the two exchanged hair versus mask challenges so Místico was added to the already planned eight-man cage match where the last man in the cage lost his hair or mask. Místico joined Negro Casas, Heavy Metal, Universo 2000 and Máscara Mágica against Aguayo's group consisting of Damián 666, Halloween and Héctor Garza leading up to the match but neither Místico or Aguayo were involved in the finish of the match where Damián pinned Máscara Mágica. In September, he reignited his feud with Último Guerrero with another singles match but in the third fall, he was attacked by Atlantis, turning Atlantis heel. Místico worked a short program with Atlantis but after he defeated Atlantis in a singles match in October, Atlantis focused more on former tag partner Blue Panther.

Místico was the biggest star in Mexico at the start of 2006. He worked eighteen main event matches during the year that drew more than ten thousand people. In the early part of the year, he teamed up with Black Warrior in two unsuccessful CMLL World Tag Team Championship challenges. In the second one, Black Warrior turned on Místico and the two began a feud. While Black Warrior was wrestling in Japan, Místico and Negro Casas defeated Averno and Mephisto for the CMLL World Tag Team Championship on April 14. When Warrior returned, the feud picked up again and Black Warrior handed Místico his first major singles defeat when he pinned him and took his NWA Middleweight Championship on a May 12 Arena México show. On September 29, Místico defeated Black Warrior in a mask versus mask match in the main event of the CMLL 73rd Anniversary Show, his first major mask win. On April 10, 2007, Místico defeated Mephisto to capture the CMLL World Welterweight Championship.

Sometime in 2007, World Wrestling Entertainment (WWE) offered Místico a contract, but due to commitments with CMLL, he was unable to sign with them at the time. Reportedly, the likes of Dean Malenko, Paul London, and Rey Mysterio pushed WWE to offer him a deal in 2007–2008. In December 2007, the Mexico City newspaper Récord reported that WWE was back in talks with Místico. In March 2008, it was reported that Místico contacted Total Nonstop Action Wrestling (TNA) to see if they were interested in having him work for their company but once again Místico's CMLL commitment kept the parties from reaching a deal. On March 10, 2008, Místico and Héctor Garza won the CMLL World Tag Team Championship by defeating Averno and Mephisto. In April, the commission declared the title vacant after a match resulted in a double disqualification. Místico and Garza reclaimed the tag team title by defeating Averno and Mephisto in a rematch. They eventually lost the title to Averno and Mephisto in December.

After the team with Garza broke up Místico began working a storyline feud against La Peste Negra ("the Black Plague"), a group consisting of Negro Casas, El Felino, and Mr. Niebla. On March 20, 2009, Místico lost his CMLL Welterweight Championship to Negro Casas in one half of the main event of the 2009 Homenaje a Dos Leyendas show. Subsequently, challenges were made for a Lucha de Apuesta between Místico and either El Felino or Mr. Niebla, but those plans were soon replaced by an Apuesta between Místico and Negro Casas, as the main event of the CMLL 76th Anniversary Show on September 18, 2009. Místico won the match two falls to one, resulting in Negro Casas was shaved bald. After the match, Místico made an Apuesta challenge to El Felino, Casas' cornerman. On December 11, 2009, Místico won a cage match against El Sagrado, Blue Panther, El Terrible, El Felino, El Texano Jr., Hijo del Fantasma and Naito to win the Festival Mundial de Lucha Libre (World Festival of Wrestling) championship.

 Feud with Volador Jr. (2010–2011) 
On January 22, 2010, Místico teamed up with Averno to participate in CMLL's Torneo Nacional de Parejas Increibles ("National Amazing Pairs tournament"), a tournament where CMLL teams up a Tecnico (Místico) and a Rudo (Averno) for a tournament. On the night of the tournament, Místico and Averno showed some surprising team unity by wearing outfits that mixed the style of each wrestler. In the first round, the team defeated Ephesto and Euforia, not showing any friction between the two, despite their long history of animosity. In the second round, Místico's attitude seemingly changed as he began attacking Volador Jr., someone he usually teams with. Místico even went so far as to ripping up Volador's mask, a rudo move, and won the match after an illegal low blow to Volador Jr. After the match, Místico took the microphone and claimed that "all was fair in war and defending Mexico City", a comment that drew a lot of boos from the crowd. Místico continued to work a Rudo style in the semi-final match, ripping at Máscara Dorada's mask. When Místico's team lost to Dorada and Atlantis the two tecnicos argued after the match. Further hints at Místico potentially turning Rudo came a few days later as Volador Jr. challenged Místico to a one on one match, a Super Libre (match with no rules) match if Místico would agree to it. The two met in the main event of an Arena México show on February 5, 2010, and this time Místico was clearly a Rúdo, tearing so viciously at Volador's mask that a new mask had to be brought to the ring between falls. In the second fall, Místico pulled his mask off and threw it to Volador Jr. in an attempt to get Volador Jr. disqualified. The end came when Volador Jr. reversed Místico's La Mística and won by applying the same move to Místico. On February 12, 2010, Místico lost the Mexican National Light Heavyweight Championship to Volador Jr. losing two falls to one. Místico, Volador Jr., La Sombra, and El Felino faced off in a four-way Lucha de Apuesta main event at the 2010 Homenaje a Dos Leyendas. Místico was not one of the first two pinned, allowing him to keep his mask. Following Dos Leyendas Místico announced that he was done being a rúdo and returned to the técnico side, although Volador Jr. remained suspicious of Místico. The storyline between the two cooled off for a bit, but in late May 2010 tension resumed as Místico and Volador Jr. faced off once again over the Mexican Light Heavyweight Championship, with Volador Jr. retaining the title. At the 2010 Sin Salida event, the two were on opposite sides of a Relevos incredibles; Místico teamed with Máscara Dorada and Mr. Águila while Volador Jr. teamed with Averno and Negro Casas. Averno came to the ring wearing the same combined Averno/Místico mask he had worn for the Parejas Incredibles tournament and tried to convince Místico to join the rúdo side, only to turn around and reveal that both he and Volador Jr. were wearing a combined Averno/Volador Jr. mask underneath. Volador Jr. worked as a rúdo throughout the match, losing the match for his team when he tried to cheat but was caught by the referee. On July 12, 2010, at the Promociones Gutiérrez 1st Anniversary Show, Místico participated in a match where 10 men put their mask on the line in a match that featured five pareja incredibles teams, with the losing team being forced to wrestle each other with their mask on the line. His partner in the match was El Oriental, facing off against the teams of Atlantis and Olímpico, La Sombra and Histeria, El Alebrije and Volador Jr., Último Guerrero and Averno. Místico and El Oriental was the last team, forcing them to face off in a one-on-one match. Místico won, forcing El Oriental to remove his mask and show his face. At the CMLL 77th Anniversary Show, Místico was one of 14 men putting their mask on the line in a Luchas de Apuestas steel cage match; he was the 11th and second to last man to leave the steel cage, keeping his mask safe.

 International travel (2008–2011) 
Místico made his debut for New Japan Pro-Wrestling (NJPW) on January 4, 2009, at Wrestle Kingdom III in Tokyo Dome. Místico wrestled in the opening match, teaming with Prince Devitt, and Ryusuke Taguchi to defeat Averno, Gedo and Jado when Místico made Averno submit using his trademark move "La Mística". After the match, Místico said he would like to return to NJPW and challenge for the IWGP Junior Heavyweight Championship. On February 15, 2009, Místico successfully defended his CMLL Welterweight Championship against Mephisto on an NJPW show in Sumo Hall, Tokyo. Místico injured his knee during the match, although he was back in action by the end of the week. Místico, Misterioso Jr., and Okumura were scheduled to work for NJPW in early May but the tour was canceled due to the outbreak of the Swine flu pandemic.

In August 2009, Místico completed his third tour with NJPW, accompanied by Okumura. On August 13, Místico teamed up with Tiger Mask to defeat Okumura and Tomohiro Ishii. Two days later, Místico defeated Tiger Mask to become the new IWGP Junior Heavyweight Champion. Upon his return to Mexico, Místico teamed with Tiger Mask and Shocker as they defeated Último Guerrero, Atlantis, and Arkangel at Dragomania IV. Místico had his first successful IWGP Junior Heavyweight Championship defense on September 29, defeating Jushin Thunder Liger. On November 8 at NJPW's Destruction '09 show Mistíco lost the IWGP title back to Tiger Mask. Místico returned to Japan in January 2011, taking part in the CMLL and New Japan Pro-Wrestling co-promoted Fantastica Mania 2011 shows. On the first show on January 22, Místico teamed with IWGP Heavyweight Champion Hiroshi Tanahashi and IWGP Junior Heavyweight Champion Prince Devitt in a six-man tag team match, in which they were defeated by Averno, Shinsuke Nakamura, and Tetsuya Naito when Averno pinned Místico. At the second show the following day, Místico defeated Averno in his final match for CMLL.

 WWE 
 Feud with Sin Cara Negro (2011–2012) 

On February 24, 2011, WWE held a press conference in Mexico City to introduce Urive under his new name, Sin Cara, which translates to "Faceless". On March 25, Sin Cara made his WWE debut at a Raw live event at Assembly Hall in Champaign, Illinois, defeating Primo in a singles match. On the April 4 episode of Raw, Sin Cara debuted, saving Daniel Bryan from an attack by WWE United States Champion Sheamus, and establishing himself as a face. On that week's SmackDown, Sin Cara similarly appeared, this time attacking Jack Swagger and cementing his face status. Sin Cara made his televised in-ring debut on April 11, defeating Primo. In the 2011 WWE draft, Sin Cara was drafted to SmackDown, making his first appearance as part of the roster on the April 29 episode with a win over Jack Swagger. Sin Cara then started a storyline feud with Chavo Guerrero, who began guest commentating his matches and, much to Sin Cara's dismay, even helped him win matches by interfering on his behalf. Sin Cara made his pay-per-view debut on May 22 at Over the Limit, defeating Chavo Guerrero. Sin Cara's undefeated streak came to an end on the July 1 episode of SmackDown, when he was defeated by Christian.

On July 17, Sin Cara participated in the SmackDown Money in the Bank ladder match at the eponymous pay-per-view but failed to earn a World Heavyweight Championship match after being taken out of the match with a storyline injury. The following day, WWE announced that it had suspended Sin Cara for 30 days for his first violation of its Wellness program. Urive later claimed in an interview that he did not know what he had tested positive for and that he had received a routine injection for an injured knee in Mexico.

The Sin Cara character returned on the August 12 episode of SmackDown, defeating Tyson Kidd; however, with Urive still serving his suspension, for this appearance Sin Cara was portrayed by WWE developmental wrestler Jorge Arriaga. After another week of Arriaga portraying Sin Cara, Urive returned under the mask on August 20 at a live event in Tacoma, Washington. On August 26 it was reported that Urive had been sent home from the week's SmackDown tapings, with Arriaga once again appearing on TV under the Sin Cara mask. During Urive's time away from WWE, the Sin Cara character seemingly turned heel by attacking Daniel Bryan.

At the tapings of the September 16 episode of SmackDown, Urive returned as the original Sin Cara, confronting the impostor version of the character. On Raws September 19 episode, the original Sin Cara was booked to face Cody Rhodes but was attacked by the impostor Sin Cara prior to the match starting. On the September 23 episode of SmackDown, the impostor Sin Cara attacked the original version during his match with Daniel Bryan, then took his place in the match and pinned Bryan for the win. The following week, the impostor revealed new black attire to distinguish himself from the original version, while also explaining that he was going to steal the Sin Cara identity from Urive, just as Urive had stolen the Místico identity from him, leading to a match between the two Sin Caras at Hell in a Cell. To further distinguish the two characters, WWE began referring to the original as Sin Cara "Azul" (Blue) and the impostor as Sin Cara "Negro" (Black). At the pay-per-view on October 2, Sin Cara Azul defeated Sin Cara Negro in a singles match.  The rivalry culminated in a Mask vs. Mask match at the October 16 taping of SmackDown in Mexico City, where Sin Cara Azul was victorious, unmasking Sin Cara Negro after the match. Afterward, the unmasked Sin Cara Negro changed his ring name to Hunico, aligned himself with Camacho and continued his rivalry with Sin Cara. On November 20, at Survivor Series, Sin Cara and Hunico were on opposite sides of a ten-man tag match. Sin Cara was eliminated after he suffered a legitimate patellar tendon rupture while diving out of the ring. He underwent surgery and was unable to wrestle for over six months.

Sin Cara returned on May 19, 2012, at a live event in Florence, South Carolina, defeating Hunico in the opening match. On the June 1 episode of SmackDown, Sin Cara returned to television in new red and white attire, defeating Heath Slater. On the July 9 episode of Raw, Sin Cara defeated Slater to qualify for the World Heavyweight Championship Money in the Bank ladder match at the Money in the Bank pay-per-view but was unsuccessful in the match itself, which was won by Dolph Ziggler.

 Teaming with Rey Mysterio (2012–2014) 

In August, Sin Cara rekindled a feud with Cody Rhodes, who claimed that he was wearing a mask to cover his ugly face. Sin Cara scored pinfall wins over Rhodes in consecutive matches on SmackDown and Raw, both times taking advantage of Rhodes trying to remove his mask. He then also saved fellow masked wrestler Rey Mysterio from being unmasked by Rhodes and afterward teamed up with Mysterio to put one of his masks on Rhodes. After defeating WWE Intercontinental Champion The Miz in a non-title match, Sin Cara was granted an opportunity to challenge for the title at Night of Champions in a four-way match, which also included Rhodes and Mysterio. The storyline between Sin Cara, Rhodes and Rey Mysterio was furthered as The Miz retained the championship. The following day on Raw, Sin Cara and Mysterio teamed up to defeat Epico and Primo in a tag team match. Sin Cara and Mysterio entered a tournament to determine the number one contenders to the WWE Tag Team Championship, defeating Primo & Epico and The Prime Time Players (Titus O'Neil and Darren Young) to advance to the final. Sin Cara and Mysterio lost the final of the tournament to the Rhodes Scholars (Cody Rhodes and Damien Sandow) on the October 22 episode of Raw. At Survivor Series on November 18, Sin Cara and Mysterio were victorious in a 10-man elimination tag team match alongside Brodus Clay, Justin Gabriel, and Tyson Kidd against the Prime Time Players, Epico, Primo, and Tensai. On December 16 at TLC: Tables, Ladders and Chairs, Sin Cara and Mysterio were defeated by Team Rhodes Scholars in a number one contenders tables match for the WWE Tag Team Championship. Two days later on SmackDown, Sin Cara suffered a legitimate knee injury and was written off television following an attack by The Shield.

Sin Cara returned on January 27, 2013, at the Royal Rumble, entering the Royal Rumble at number twenty-nine but was eliminated by Ryback. On the following episode of SmackDown, Sin Cara and Rey Mysterio defeated WWE Tag Team Champions Team Hell No (Daniel Bryan and Kane) in a non-title match.  Sin Cara returned to television on the May 15 episode of Main Event, defeating Intercontinental Champion Wade Barrett in a non-title match. During the August 19 episode of Raw, Sin Cara dislocated his ring finger during a match with Alberto Del Rio. Urive's final match as Sin Cara was against Alberto Del Rio at a show in Monterrey, Mexico on October 19.

In January 2014, Urive announced that he would return to Mexico in February. An interview of Urive that aired in late January saw Urive claim that while he had departed WWE, he still owned the Sin Cara character; Urive also blamed WWE for not allowing him to wrestle the style he used in Mexico. WWE stated on March 27 that they had released Urive on March 26.

 Lucha Libre AAA Worldwide (2014–2015) 
On February 19, 2014, the Wrestling Observer Newsletter reported that Urive had signed with Lucha Libre AAA Worldwide (AAA) and would be making his debut two days later. At the end of AAA's February 21 event, AAA's main rudo stable, La Sociedad, attacked the promotion's top tecnicos with help from the debuting Black Warrior. This led to AAA president Marisela Peña Roldán revealing her own surprise wrestler, Urive, who appeared on the darkened entrance stage but did not enter the ring or say anything. It was later reported that Urive was under a WWE non-compete clause until May and could therefore not show his mask. On May 17, Urive made another appearance, during which he was referred to only as a "mysterious wrestler", attacking La Sociedad and targeting especially his old rival Averno, who was making his AAA debut. On May 28, AAA revealed promotional material, which suggested Urive would be returning to the Místico ring name, however, on June 5, the promotion revealed his new ring name as Myzteziz. The ring name is exclusive to AAA and Urive will continue to work as Sin Cara outside of the promotion. Myzteziz made his in-ring debut on June 7 at Verano de Escándalo, where he, Cibernético and La Parka defeated Averno, Chessman and El Hijo del Perro Aguayo in a six-man tag team main event, with Myzteziz submitting the AAA Latin American Champion Chessman for the win. On August 17 at Triplemanía XXII, Myzteziz took part in a four-way elimination main event for Copa Triplemanía XXII. In the end, Myzteziz lost the match, after taking a low blow from the winner, El Hijo del Perro Aguayo. On October 12 at Héroes Inmortales VIII, Myzteziz won a Royal Rumble Lumberjack match to win the Copa Antonio Peña. On May 24, 2015, Myzteziz came together with two former WWE superstars El Patrón Alberto and Rey Mysterio Jr. to form the "Dream Team" for AAA's Lucha Libre World Cup. The trio eventually won the tournament, defeating Johnny Mundo, Matt Hardy, and Mr. Anderson in the finals.

On August 9 at Triplemanía XXIII, Myzteziz was defeated by Mysterio in what was billed as a "dream match". Following the match, Myzteziz turned rudo, attacking Mysterio and challenging him to a Mask vs. Mask rematch. After appearing at a CMLL event on October 9, Urive announced he was looking to return to the promotion after finishing his commitments with AAA. On October 12, AAA put out a press release, announcing that Urive was no longer part of the promotion.

 Lucha Libre Elite and independent circuit (2015–present) 
Sin Cara's first post-WWE match took place at his self-produced independent event on February 1, which featured wrestlers from both AAA and CMLL. In the main event, Sin Cara teamed with his brother Argenis, and La Sombra to defeat another one of his brothers, Argos, Black Warrior and El Oriental, submitting Warrior for the win with La Mística. On March 1, Sin Cara defeated Black Warrior to win the vacant Baja Star's Wrestling (BSW) Intercontinental Middleweight Championship.

On October 16, 2015, upon joining the Lucha Libre Elite promotion, Urive announced his new ring name as Místic 2.0. However, on October 25, he announced he would instead be using the name "Carístico", a combination of the names Sin Cara and Místico. On May 21, 2016, Carístico became the inaugural Lucha Libre Elite Middleweight Champion. On August 21, 2016, Carístico returned to NJPW, teaming with Titán and Volador Jr. in a six-man tag team match, where they defeated Euforia, Gran Guerrero and Último Guerrero. On September 16, Carístico returned to Michinoku Pro Wrestling, entering the 2016 Fukumen World League and defeating Samba Rio de Janeiro in his first-round match. Over the next three days, Carístico defeated Jackie Lin, Sugi and finally Revolución to win the tournament and force Revolución to unmask. At Promocione El Cholo's Christmas show Carístico defeated Histeria in a Luchas de Apuestas match, forcing Histeria to unmask and reveal his real name, Alfonso Peña, per lucha libre traditions.

Carístico's debut within the Puerto Rico circuit took place on May 26, 2018, losing to Roger Díaz in a match for Champion's Wrestling Association (CWA) world heavyweight championship. Despite working under his CMLL character, his previous role as Sin Cara was emphasized during the reveal and the promotion for the event. On November 3, 2018, Carístico outlasted Ángel de Oro, Dragon Bane, Freelance, Gran Guerrero. Laredo Kid, Valiente, and Sadico to win the Lucha Libre Boom Cruiserweight Championship. Carístico defeated Bárbaro Cavernario and Emperado Azteca to become the first cruiserweight champion of the Monterrey, Nuevo León based KAOZ based promotion.

 Return to CMLL (2015–present) 

On December 12, 2015, Carístico returned to CMLL, wrestling his first match for the company since early 2011. At the time of his return, CMLL and Lucha Libre Elite were working closely together as several CMLL wrestlers worked LLE shows and several LLE wrestlers worked on CMLL shows as well. Carístico would subsequently become a regular for CMLL, splitting his time between the two promotions. When CMLL broke off their relationship with LLE in September 2016 Carístico was the only LLE regular who was allowed to also work for CMLL. For the 2016 Torneo Nacional de Parejas Increíbles ("National Incredible Teams Tournament" Carístico was forced to team up with LLE rival Cibernético for the tag team tournament. The team defeated the teams of The Panther and Tiger, Rey Escorpión and Último Guerrero and finally Atlantis and Gran Guerrero to qualify for the finals. In the finals Carístico finally wrestled against the man who had taken over the Místico character, Místico II, falling to Místico and Mephisto in the finals as Carístico and Cibernético were unable to get along.

On January 27, 2017, Carístico challenged for a CMLL championship for the first time since leaving CMLL in 2011 but was unable to win the CMLL World Welterweight Championship from Mephisto. In June 2017 Carístico teamed up with novato wrestler Soberano for the 2017 Gran Alternativa ("Great Alternative") tournament. The duo defeated the teams of Ángel de Oro and Oro Jr., Flyer and Volador Jr., Canelo Casas and Negro Casas to qualify for the finals. On June 16 the two defeated Sansón and Último Guerrero to win the 2017 Gran Alternativa tournament. On August 21, 2018, he defeated longtime rival Último Guerrero to win the NWA World Historic Middleweight Championship for the first time. He followed up his championship victory with a successful championship defense against Guerrero's younger brother Gran Guerrero, on October 2.

Due to holding the NWA World Historic Middleweight Championship Carístico qualified for the Universal Championship tournament for the first time since the 2009 tournament.  In the first round he defeated Mexican National Light Heavyweight Champion Bárbaro Cavernario, but lost to CMLL World Lightweight Champion Dragon Lee to be eliminated from the tournament.

At Día de Muertos, Carístico joined Místico II as Alianza de Plata y Oro (Gold and Silver Alliance) to win the CMLL World Tag Team Titles. They retained the belts until August 25, 2021, when Místico II was released from CMLL. That same day, the promotion announced Urive would use the name and mask of Místico again.

 In other media 

Capitalizing on Místico's popularity, CMLL created a comic book starring Místico as an urban hero. The comic reached its 50th issue in December 2007. Místico starred in a music video for the song "Me Muero" by the Spanish pop group La 5ª Estación and in two music videos for Banda Pequeños Musical, the song was also his entrance music while working as Místico. In 2009, he starred in a commercial endorsing the PAN (National Action Party) political party in Mexico.

Urive, as Sin Cara, appears as a playable character in the video games WWE '12, WWE '13 and WWE 2K14.

Wrestling style, persona, and reception
Early in his career Urive began to stand out from other lower ranked wrestlers because of the speed that he was able to execute various high flying lucha libre moves and dives both in and out of the ring. Pro Wrestling Illustrated noted that his La Mística finishing move was often executed so fast that his opponents did not have time to react until it was locked in. La Mística is, in reality, a series of moves used by many wrestlers over the years, but Urive's combination of the spinning Tilt-a-whirl headscissors takedown transitioned into a single arm DDT that brings his opponent to the mat, allowing him to instantly switch the move into a Fujiwara armbar, normally on the opponent's left arm, that would force his opponent to submit. The "La Mística" move became so synonymous with the Místico character that Urive's successor also adopted it as his finishing move. Urive would on occasion use the move while working as Sin Cara and made it his main finishing move after returning to Mexico. Working as Sin Cara he primarily used a Moonsault side slam and a  Senton bomb as his finishing moves. Both finishing moves are executed off the top rope, for the Moonsault side slam an opponent was thrown off the top rope with Urive landing on top of the opponent while the Senton sees Urive leap off the top rope onto a prone opponent.

In 2006 and 2007, the readers of the Wrestling Observer Newsletter voted him the "Best Flying Wrestler" category based on his in-ring performance in Mexico. However, his reputation as a wrestler in Mexico contrasted with his work in WWE. While he was considered a huge deal when he signed with WWE, he developed a reputation of being prone to not being able to execute some of the high-risk/high-flying moves, labeling the problems as "botching" the moves. The reputation followed him for the entire three years of his WWE career. Former WWE producer Arn Anderson stated that: "this guy didn't show me anything. Not a damn thing. He had a bad attitude." Rey Mysterio said during an interview that Urive didn't "have the desire" to be in WWE. Jorge Arriaga, who took the Sin Cara character when Urive was fired, said that "[the original Sin Cara] is the biggest signing that he had from Mexico. He comes in, he doesn't do anything".

Throughout his career, Urive has primarily portrayed a técnico (those that portray the good guys in wrestling) character, with brief periods of time where he played a more ambiguous character who straddled the técnico/rudo divide. When introduced as Místico in 2004 CMLL created an elaborate fictional backstory, where Místico was an orphan who was taught to wrestle by Fray Tormenta, a wrestling priest who also acted as his Padrino ("Godfather") early on. As part of the religious backstory Místico would often pose with his hands put together in a "praying" motion as well as adorning his tights with crucifix like patterns. Early in his career he wore mainly white trunks and masks with either silver or gold adornment, earning him the nickname "El Príncipe de Plata y Oro" ("The Prince of Silver and Gold). The Místico mask only has eye holes, totally covering the nose, mouth, and ears, a design that was replicated in the masks Urive wore or wear as Sin Cara, Myzteziz and Carístico with variations on the design that adorns the mask. The Carístico mask retains the same basic design as the Místico but with an added crucifix on the forehead and sweeping wing design around the eye openings.

 Championships and accomplishments 

 Lucha Libre AAA Worldwide Copa Antonio Peña (2014)
 Lucha Libre World Cup (2015) – with El Patrón Alberto and Rey Mysterio Jr.
 Baja Star's Wrestling BSW Intercontinental Middleweight Championship (1 time)
 Consejo Mundial de Lucha LibreCMLL Universal Championship (2022)
 CMLL World Tag Team Championship (5 times) – with Negro Casas (2), Héctor Garza (2) and Místico (1)
 CMLL World Welterweight Championship (1 time)
 Mexican National Light Heavyweight Championship (1 time)
NWA World Historic Middleweight Championship (1 time, current)
 NWA World Middleweight Championship (2 times)
Copa Bicentenario (2022) - with Rocky Romero
 Torneo Gran Alternativa (2004) – with El Hijo del Santo
 Torneo Gran Alternativa (2007) – with La Sombra
 Torneo Gran Alternativa (2017) – with Soberano
 Torneo Gran Alternativa (2022) – with Panterita del Ring Jr.
Torneo Nacional de Parejas Increíbles (2020) – with Forastero
 Leyenda de Plata (2006, 2007, 2008)
 Festival Mundial de Lucha Libre FMLL World Championship (1 time)
 International Wrestling Revolution Group IWRG Intercontinental Super Welterweight Championship (1 time)Kaoz Lucha LibreKaoz Cruiserweight Championship (1 time, current)Lucha Libre BoomLLB Cruiserweight Championship (1 time, current)Lucha Libre EliteElite Middleweight Championship (1 time, current)
Liga Élite (2016)
 Michinoku Pro Wrestling Fukumen World League (2016)
 Michinoku Trios League (2003) – with Hayate and Yamabiko
 New Japan Pro-Wrestling IWGP Junior Heavyweight Championship (1 time)Promociones El CholoPromociones El Cholo Cruiserweight Championship (1 time)
 Pro Wrestling Illustrated Ranked 3 of the 500 best singles wrestlers in the PWI 500 in 2007
 Pro Wrestling Revolution PWR Openweight World Championship (1 time)
 Toryumon Mexico Sofia Cup (2005)
 Universal Wrestling Entertainment Trofeo Bicentenario (2010)World Wrestling AssociationWWA Middleweight Championship (1 time)
 WWE Slammy Award (1 time)
Double Vision Moment of the Year (2011) – with Sin Cara Negro
 Wrestling Observer Newsletter'''''
 Best Box Office Draw (2006)
 Best Box Office Draw of the Decade (2000–2009)
 Best Flying Wrestler (2006–2007)
 Wrestler of the Year (2006)
 Wrestling Observer Newsletter Hall of Fame (2022)

Luchas de Apuestas record

Footnotes

References

External links 

 

 
1982 births
Living people
Masked wrestlers
Mexican male professional wrestlers
Professional wrestlers from Mexico City
IWGP Junior Heavyweight champions
CMLL World Tag Team Champions
20th-century professional wrestlers
21st-century professional wrestlers
CMLL World Welterweight Champions
NWA World Historic Middleweight Champions
NWA World Middleweight Champions
Mexican National Light Heavyweight Champions